The following is a list of notable Spanish Filipinos. A Spanish Filipino is any citizen or resident of the Philippines who is of Spanish or Hispanic origin.

A - C 
 Carla Abellana, actress, commercial model
 Jon Ramon Aboitiz, industrialist, member of Aboitiz clan
 Neile Adams, Filipino-American actress, singer and dancer. Ex-wife of Steve McQueen
 Ryan Agoncillo, actor, TV host
 Paulino Alcántara, footballer and manager of Club de Futbol de Barcelona
 Alona Alegre, actress
 Jojo Alejar, TV host, comedian
 José Alejandrino, Filipino general during the Philippine Revolution and the Philippine-American War
 Mariano Álvarez, revolutionary general
 Pinky Amador, actress, singer, commercial model and TV host
 Manuel Amechazurra, footballer
 Fernando Amorsolo, Was one of the most important artists in the history of painting in the Philippines
 Martin Andanar, radio, broadcasting journalist
 Gerald Anderson, actor, model
 Boots Anson-Roa, veteran actress
 Sol Aragones, former reporter
 Araneta family, prominent Spanish Filipino family
 Atom Araullo, currently broadcasting journalistic, reporter, film documentary for GMA News
 Robert Arevalo, artistic actor
 John Arcilla, actor
 Francis Arnaiz, former player of Toyota and Ginebra San Miguel basketball team, from 1975-1986
 Basti Artadi, vocalist of Wolfgang
 Luis Eduardo Aute, A Philippine-born Spanish singer, songwriter, film director, actor, sculptor, writer and painter
 Mig Ayesa, Filipino-Australian singer
 Francisco Balagtas, Historic Philippine hero on poetry
 Carlos Balcells, musician, businessman, politician
 Paolo Ballesteros, actor, TV host, comedian, impersonator
 Jesus Balmori, journalist, playwright, and poet
 Claudine Barreto, actress
 Aljo Bendijo, currently broadcasting journalistic for Sentro Balita weekdays
 Nida Blanca, actress
 Jackie Lou Blanco, actress
 Andres Bonifacio, Founder of the Katipunan, Philippine Hero
 Bernard Bonnin, actor
 J.C. Bonnin, actor
 Jose Burgos, martyr, priest
 Benedicto Cabrera, Filipino painter, was awarded National Artist of the Philippines for Visual Arts
 Iza Calzado, actress, model
 Antonio Carpio, lawyer
 Levi Celerio, artistic outstanding national artist of The Philippines for music & literature
 Tia Carrere, actress
 Carlos Celdran, artist, tour guide and cultural activist
 Claire Celdran, broadcast journalist, news anchor CNN Philippines
 Gabby Concepcion, actor, director, singer-songwriter, businessman
 Pilita Corrales, singer and songwriter
 Donna Cruz, actress, opm artist, singer
 Tirso Cruz III, artistic actor
 Sunshine Cruz, actress
 Ramon Christopher, actor
 Jake Cuenca, actor, model

D - G
 Noli De Castro,  Former Vice President of the Philippines, journalist
 Mark Dacascos, actor, martial artist
 Dingdong Dantes, actor, television presenter, dancer, commercial model and film producer 
 Marlene Daudén, actress
 Charlie Davao, actor
 Ricky Davao, actor, host, director
 Jose de la Cruz, historic writer and poetry
 Maggie dela Riva, actress
 Joey de Leon, comedian, actor, television presenter and songwriter
 Johnny Delgado, actor
 Michael de Mesa, actor
 Carli de Murga, footballer
 Nestor de Villa, classic film actor
 Angelika Dela Cruz, actress, model
 Desiree del Valle, actress, model
 Gregorio del Pilar, one of the youngest generals in the history of the Philippines
 Marcelo H. del Pilar, Filipino writer, lawyer and journalist in the Spanish Era
 Monsour Del Rosario, actor, producer and martial artist
 Mila del Sol, classic film actress
 Rogelio de la Rosa, actor, diplomat
 Isabelo de los Reyes, politician, writer and labor activist
 Paquito Diaz, actor
 Romy Diaz, actor
 Gloria Diaz, beauty queen, actress
 Gloria Romero, veteran actress
 Fred Elizalde, classical and jazz pianist, composer, conductor and bandleader
 Joaquín Miguel Elizalde, diplomat and businessman
 Geoff Eigenmann, actor
 Ryan Eigenmann, actor
 Alvin Elchico, reporter, journalistic of TV Patrol Weekend
 Juan Ponce Enrile, Jr., politician, businessman
 Sally Ponce Enrile, politician
 Elise Estrada, singer-songwriter & artistic actress
 Jaime Fabregas, film actor and musical director
 Edmundo Farolan, actor, director and writer
 Julián Felipe, Composer of the Philippine National Anthem
 Andion Fernandez, operatic soprano
 Rudy Fernandez, actor, film producer and director
 Amalia Fuentes, actress
 Peque Gallaga, veteran director-actor
 Helen Gamboa, veteran actress and cooking host
 Gazini Ganados, Miss Universe-Philippines 2019, model and TV presenter
 Mariano Garchitorena, politician
 Caloy Garcia, coach of Rain or Shine Elasto Painters.
 Cheska Garcia, actress, TV host, model
 Coleen Garcia, actress, host and model
 Eddie Garcia, film actor and director
 Patrick Garcia, actor and model
 Toni Rose Gayda, TV host
 Janno Gibbs, actor, comedian, and singer
 Cherie Gil, actress
 Enrique Gil, actor and product endorser
 Mark Gil, actor
 Rosemarie Gil, actress
 Dominador Gómez, nationalist, physician and a labor leader
 Mariano Gomez, martyr, priest
 Charlene Gonzales, Bb. Pilipinas-Universe 1994, actress, TV host, model
 Cristina Gonzales, actress, politician, model
 Jose Mari Gonzales, actor, businessman, politician
 Isabel Granada, singer and actor
 Fernando María Guerrero, poet, journalist, lawyer, politician and polyglot
 Angel Guirado, footballer
 Eddie Gutierrez, actor
 Janine Gutierrez, actress
 Raymond Gutierrez, TV host, editor, columnist, endorser and actor
 Richard Gutierrez, actor
 Ruffa Gutierrez, actress

H - L
 Kristine Hermosa, actress
 Adriano Hernández, Filipino revolutionary, patriot and military strategist during the Philippine Revolution and the Philippine-American War.
 Subas Herrero, actor, comedian, singer
 Félix Hidalgo, Acknowledged as one of the great Filipino painters of the late 19th century
 Pia Hontiveros, broadcast journalist, Chief Correspondent CNN Philippines
 Enrique Iglesias, singer
 Julio Iglesias Jr., singer
 Dick Israel,  character actor
 Emilio Jacinto, Filipino general during the Philippine Revolution
 Junior, singer and actor in Spain and the Philippines
 Lalaine American singer and actress
 Monique Lhuillier, famous US-based fashion designer to celebrities
 Lilet, singer, TV host, actress and model
 Celso Lobregat, politician
 Gina Lopez, advocate & TV host
 Graciano Lopez-Jaena, Founder and first editor of the newspaper La Solidaridad
 Caloy Loyzaga, Filipino basketball player
 Chito Loyzaga, former basketball player
 Diego Loyzaga, actor and VJ
 Joey Loyzaga, basketball player
 Maloy Lozanes, singer, German Eurodance, based in Germany
 Sid Lucero, actor
 Antonio Luna, Historic Philippine general
 Juan Luna, Was a Filipino painter, sculptor and a political activist of the Philippine Revolution during the late 19th century
 Pauleen Luna, actress, TV host

M - Q
 Ruru Madrid, actor, comedian, TV host
 Jamby Madrigal, politician, businesswoman
 Vicente Madrigal, business tycoon, industrialist and politician
 Pancho Magalona, actor
 Francisco Mañosa, famous architect noted for his Filipino inspired architectural designs
 Edu Manzano, actor, host, product endorser, and politician
 Luis Manzano, actor, host, and product endorser
 Joseph Marco, actor, commercial model
 Imelda Marcos, wife of the late President Ferdinand Marcos
 Coco Martin, actor, director, commercial model
 Albert Martinez, actor, director, and producer.
 William Martinez, actor
 Cherie Mercado, currently broadcasting journalistic employee for CNN Philippines
 Eddie Mesa, actor, singer, pastor
 Mario Montenegro, classic film actor
 Valeen Montenegro, actress, model
 Vina Morales, singer and actress
 Margarita Moran-Floirendo, Miss Universe 1973, patron of the arts, peace advocate
 German Moreno, actor, comedian, host, talent manager
 Aga Muhlach, actor, host, and product endorser
 Niño Muhlach, actor
 Diether Ocampo, actor, singer, model and military officer
 Mario O'Hara, film director, film producer and screenwriter
 Henry Omaga-Diaz, broadcaster journalistic of ABS-CBN News
 Marga Ortigas, broadcast journalist with Al Jazeera English, former reporter with CNN International
 José Ozámiz, Senator and Governor of Misamis Occidental
 Rommel Padilla, actor, businessman
 Bernard Palanca, actor and product endorser
 Paraluman, classic film actress
 Marcelo Azcárraga Palmero, the thirteenth Prime Minister of Spain.
 Javier Patiño, Azkal's striker
 Amy Perez, TV host and actress
 Barbara Perez, actress
 Pilar Pilapil, veteran actress
 Fernando Poe Jr., actor, producer, and director
 Fernando Poe Sr., actor
 Lovi Poe, actress, model
 Rico J. Puno, OPM singer, politician
 Isabel Preysler, Spanish socialite and TV host, mother of Enrique Iglesias, former spouse of Julio Iglesias
 Manuel L. Quezon, first President of the Commonwealth of the Philippines

R - T

 Annabelle Rama, actress
 Polo Ravales, actor, model
 Delia Razon, actress
 Enrique K. Razon, industrialist, head of International Container Terminal Services, Inc.
 John Regala, actor, Christian minister, environmentalist
 Ram Revilla, actor, model
 Ramon Revilla Sr., former actor, former movie producer, politician
 Efren Reyes Jr., actor
 Efren Reyes Sr., actor, producer, and director
 Artemio Ricarte, Historic Philippine General
 Guillermo Gómez Rivera, Hispanist, multilingual author, historian, language scholar
 Jose Mercado Rizal, Philippine national hero
 Ross Rival, actor
 Marian Rivera, actress and model
 Miguel Rodriguez, actor, politician, model
 Paco Román, colonel in the Philippine Revolutionary Army
 Daisy Romualdez, actress
 Daniel Z. Romualdez, politician
 Norberto Romualdez, writer, politician, jurist, and statesman
 Rosa Rosal,  actress
 Jericho Rosales, actor, model, singer, TV host
 Janella Salvador, actress and singer
 Lou Salvador, basketball player, stage actor, and talent manager
 Lou Salvador Jr. actor, dubbed as "James Dean of the Philippines"
 Maja Salvador, actress
 Phillip Salvador, actor
 Sylvia Sanchez, actress
 Alex Santos, currently broadcasting journalistic & narrator
 Charo Santos-Concio, board member chief content of ABS-CBN Corporation president & president ceo of ABS-CBN University, letter reader TV host
 Rob Schneider, actor, comedian
 Armida Siguion-Reyna, celebrity, singer, film and stage actress, producer, television show host
 Gabriela Silang, female revolutionary leader
 Erik Santos, opm singer
 Connie Sison, currently broadcasting journalistic for Balitang Tanghali
 Shalani Soledad, politician
 Jesusa Purificacion Levy Sonora, actress, endorser
 Andres Soriano, industrialist, soldier, philanthropist, former President of San Miguel, founder of ANSCOR
 Andres Soriano Jr., industrialist, philanthropist, former CEO of San Miguel Corporation and ANSCOR 
 Ali Sotto, actress, radio am broadcasting, currently broadcasting journalistic for GMA News TV
 Tito Sotto, actor, comedian, politician 
 Vic Sotto, actor comedian
 Eduardo Teus, a footballer who played for Real Madrid.
 Lorna Tolentino, actress
 Thea Tolentino, actress, model
 Tessie Tomas, actress and comedian
 Lucy Torres-Gomez, politician, actress, TV host, model
 Tomas Trigo, Azkal's goalkeeper
 Juancho Trivino, actor, model

U - Z
 Ariel Ureta, comedian, actor, TV host
 Luis Rodríguez Varela, "El Conde Filipino", early Philippine nationalist
 Ronaldo Valdez, actor
 Gary Valenciano, singer, composer, arranger, writer
 Alfred Vargas, educator, actor
 Jake Vargas, actor, singer-songwriter, musician, dancer of GMA Artist Center
 Ian Veneracion, actor, pilot, sportsman
 Nova Villa, actress, veteran comedian
 Emilio Villeta, industrialist, franchised dealer of Francisco Motors Corporation
 Roi Vinzon, actor, director
 Jillian Ward, actress and product endorser (due to Mexican Hispanic heritage)
 Yael Yuzon, lead singer and rhythm guitarist of Band Spongecola
 Jessa Zaragoza, opm singer, actress, comedian
 Jacinto Zamora, martyr, priest
 Zobel de Ayala family, prominent Spanish Filipino family; business billionaire person
 Enrique Zobel, industrialist, Philippine Air Force Colonel, pilot, polo player, philanthropist
 Jaime Augusto Zobel de Ayala, industrialist, philanthropist, member of the Zobel de Ayala clan
 Jaime Zobel de Ayala, industrialist, philanthropist, member of the Zobel de Ayala clan
 Fernando Zóbel de Ayala y Montojo, painter, art collector, founded Museo de Arte Abstracto Español in Spain
 Joel Reyes Zobel, radio broadcaster, currently broadcasting journalistic for GMA NEWS TV
 Juan Miguel Zubiri, politician, businessman, environmentalist

See also
Filipino people of Spanish ancestry
Latin Union
Hispanic
List of hispanophones
Hispanosphere
Panhispanism

References

Spanish Philippines
Hispanic and Latino
Spanish diaspora